Uranium–uranium dating is a radiometric dating technique which compares two isotopes of uranium (U) in a sample: uranium-234 (234U) and uranium-238 (238U). It is one of several radiometric dating techniques exploiting the uranium radioactive decay series, in which 238U undergoes 14 alpha and beta decay events on the way to the stable isotope 206Pb. Other dating techniques using this decay series include uranium–thorium dating and uranium–lead dating.

Uranium series
238U, with a half-life of about 4.5 billion years, decays to 234U through emission of an alpha particle to thorium-234 (234Th), which is comparatively unstable with a half-life of just 24 days. 234Th then decays through beta particle emission to protactinium-234 (234Pa). This decays with a half-life of 6.7 hours, again through emission of a beta particle, to 234U. This isotope has a half-life of about 245,000 years. The next decay product, thorium-230 (230Th), has a half-life of about 75,000 years and is used in the uranium-thorium technique.  Although analytically simpler, in practice 234U/238U requires knowledge of the ratio at the time the material under study was formed and is generally used only for samples older than the ca. 450,000 year upper limit of the 230Th/238U technique. For those materials (principally marine carbonates) for which these conditions apply, it remains a superior technique.

Unlike other radiometric dating techniques, those using the uranium decay series (except for those using the stable final isotopes 206Pb and 207Pb) compare the ratios of two radioactive unstable isotopes. This complicates calculations as both the parent and daughter isotopes decay over time into other isotopes.

In theory, the 234U/238U technique can be useful in dating samples between about 10,000 and 2 million years Before Present (BP), or up to about eight times the half-life of 234U.  As such, it provides a useful bridge in radiometric dating techniques between the ranges of 230Th/238U (accurate up to ca. 450,000 years) and U–Pb dating (accurate up to the age of the solar system, but problematic on samples younger than about 2 million years).

See also 
 Carbon dating
 Chronological dating

References

Radiometric dating
Uranium